Astro Boy: The Video Game is an action platform video game based on the 2009 CGI-animated film of the same name. The game was released in Japan on October 8, 2009 for the PlayStation Portable under the name  to coincide with the Japanese theatrical release on October 10, 2009. It was later released on the same system as a downloadable game in North America on October 14, 2009. It received a retail version of it and a port to the PlayStation 2, Wii and Nintendo DS which were released on October 20, 2009 to coincide with the North American theatrical release of the film on October 23, 2009. It features the voices of Freddie Highmore and Kristen Bell, reprising their film roles.

Plot
In the game, players become the iconic hero, Astro Boy, and take to the streets and skies on an epic adventure to save Metro City from the clutches of the sinister President Stone and his robot army.

Gameplay
The game allows the player to be Astro Boy, utilising his array of weapons while fighting robot armies. The game features levels set on the ground, in which Astro fights while advancing by walking, and also in the air, which mainly includes Astro shooting airborne enemies down using his finger laser, reminiscent of Omega Factor’s gameplay in a 2D platformer format. Collectables include different costumes and also power-ups found in difficult-to-reach or hidden areas. While attacking, alongside his normal attacks, a player may wish to activate a 'Special Attack', provided they have enough energy to do so. A meter limits the amount of Special Attacks a player can use, being Arm Cannons, Butt Machine Guns and Absorb (which allows the player to recharge a certain portion of their health).

It features both a single-player mode as well as a multiplayer mode, with the second player being another Astro in an alternate costume. During Story Mode, if a player loses a life while the other is still playing he or she would, after a certain period of time, be able to re-join the game with full health. However, if both players lose lives that the same time, the game is lost. A separate mode allows both players to fight in the robot games ring, and the player with the most points at the end wins.

The game offers numerous unlockable and collectable elements that include exclusive art work, different versions of Astro Boy and more, as players live the story solo or side by side with a friend in 2-player co-op mode on the Wii and PlayStation 2 versions.

Reception

The PlayStation 2 and PSP versions received "mixed" reviews, while the DS and Wii versions received "generally unfavorable reviews", according to the review aggregation website Metacritic. In Japan, Famitsu gave the PSP version a score of two sixes, one five, and one four for a total of 21 out of 40.

Giancarlo Varanini of GameSpot said the Wii version featured "sloppy hand-to-hand combat," "repetitive level design," "muddled and unimpressive graphics," and that the game is "too short." While he did find many problems with the game, he did say it was "slightly more fun with a buddy." He also criticized the game for not "capitalizing on Astro Boy's skills."

Jack DeVries of IGN called the Wii version "a mediocre brawler with some pretty good shooter levels." DeVries also said that "The in-game cutscenes are hilariously bad." He summarizes the game by saying, "It all comes off as bland."

Jon Carlos of Game Vortex gave the same version a fairly good review, saying, "I give Astro Boy: The Video Game kudos for at least heading in the right direction when it comes to gameplay design." However, he noted that, "Unfortunately, Astro Boy: The Video Game isn't much more than another film cash-in. Nearly everything in this game is stale, uninteresting and forgettable."

References

External links
 Astro Boy: The Video Game at Internet Movie Database
 

2009 video games
Action video games
Astro Boy video games
D3 Publisher games
PlayStation Portable games
Nintendo DS games
PlayStation 2 games
Superhero video games
Tezuka Productions
Video games based on animated films
Video games based on adaptations
Wii games
Multiplayer and single-player video games
Video games developed in the United States
High Voltage Software games